MacMurrough is a townland in the parish of New Ross, County Wexford, Ireland. According to local tradition, it is called after a 12th-century king of Leinster, Dermot MacMurrough, who is supposed to have had a hunting lodge there. The lodge, if that is what it was, was destroyed during railway construction in the nineteenth century.

References

Townlands of County Wexford